Goodbye Yellow Brick Road is the seventh studio album by English singer-songwriter Elton John, first released on 5 October 1973 as a double LP. The album has sold more than 20 million copies worldwide and is widely regarded as John's magnum opus. Among the 17 tracks, the album contains the hits "Candle in the Wind", US number-one single "Bennie and the Jets", "Goodbye Yellow Brick Road" and "Saturday Night's Alright for Fighting" plus live favourites "Funeral for a Friend/Love Lies Bleeding" and "Harmony".

Recorded at the Studio d'enregistrement Michel Magne at the Château d'Hérouville in France, the album became a double LP once John and his band became inspired by the locale. The album was inducted into the Grammy Hall of Fame in 2003, and continues to be highly regarded in various rankings.

Production 
Under the working titles of Vodka and Tonics and Silent Movies, Talking Pictures, Bernie Taupin wrote the lyrics in two and a half weeks, with John composing most of the melodies in three days while staying at the Pink Flamingo Hotel in Kingston, Jamaica. John had wanted to go to Jamaica, in part because the Rolling Stones had just recorded Goats Head Soup there.

Production on the album was started in Jamaica in January 1973, but due to difficulties with the sound system and the studio piano, logistical issues arising from the Joe Frazier–George Foreman boxing match taking place in Kingston, and protests over the political and economic situation in the country, the band decided to move before any productive work was done.

Goodbye Yellow Brick Road was recorded in two weeks at the Studio d'enregistrement Michel Magne, at the Château d'Hérouville near Pontoise, in France, where John had previously recorded Honky Château and Don't Shoot Me I'm Only the Piano Player. While a version of "Saturday Night's Alright for Fighting" was recorded in Jamaica, that recording was discarded; the released version of the song came from the sessions at the Château.

According to the album's producer, Gus Dudgeon, the album was not planned as a two-record collection. John and Taupin composed a total of 22 tracks for the album, of which 18 (counting "Funeral for a Friend" and "Love Lies Bleeding" as two distinct tracks) were used, enough that it was released as a double album, John's first (three more such albums followed up to 2011). Through the medium of cinematic metaphor, the album builds on nostalgia for a childhood and culture left in the past. Tracks include "Bennie and the Jets", "Goodbye Yellow Brick Road", the 11-minute "Funeral for a Friend/Love Lies Bleeding", and the Marilyn Monroe tribute "Candle in the Wind". "Saturday Night's Alright for Fighting" was inspired by memories of a Market Rasen pub Taupin frequented when younger. "Grey Seal", previously the B-side of the 1970 single "Rock and Roll Madonna", was re-recorded for the album.

"Harmony", the album's final track, was considered as a fourth single, but was not issued at the time because the chart longevity of the album and its singles brought it too close to the upcoming releases of Caribou and its proposed accompanying singles. It was, however, used as the B-side of the American release of the "Bennie and the Jets" single, and was popular on FM playlists of the day, especially WBZ-FM in Boston, whose top 40 chart allowed for the inclusion of LP cuts and B-sides as voted for by listeners. "Harmony" spent three weeks at no. 1 on WBZ-FM's chart in June 1974 and ranked no. 6 for the year, with "Bennie and the Jets" at no. 1 and "Don't Let the Sun Go Down on Me" behind "Harmony" at no. 7. "Harmony" was released as a single in Britain in 1980 and failed to chart.

Release and reception 

The album was released on 5 October 1973 as a double LP, with cover art by illustrator Ian Beck depicting John stepping into a poster.  It debuted at no. 17 on the Billboard 200  and quickly rose to no. 1 on its fourth week on the chart, where it stayed for eight consecutive weeks.  It was the best selling album in the US in 1974. The album was preceded by its lead single, "Saturday Night's Alright for Fighting", which reached no. 7 in the UK and no. 12 in the US. Its next single, "Goodbye Yellow Brick Road" reached no. 6 in the UK and no. 2 in the US. "Bennie and the Jets" was released as a single in the US, and it topped the Billboard Hot 100 for one week in 1974.  And its final single, "Candle in the Wind", released in the UK, reached no. 11.

The original 1973 LP, when released on CD, was released on two discs, while the 1992 and 1995 CD remasters put the album on one disc as it was slightly less than 80 minutes. The 30th anniversary edition followed the original format, splitting the album across two discs to allow the inclusion of the bonus tracks, while a DVD on the making of the album was also included. The album has also been released by Mobile Fidelity as a single disc 24 karat gold CD. The album (including all four bonus tracks) was released on SACD (2003), DVD-Audio (2004), and Blu-ray Audio (2014). These high resolution releases included the original stereo mixes, as well as 5.1 remixes produced and engineered by Greg Penny.

Goodbye Yellow Brick Road is widely regarded as one of John's best albums, and is one of his most popular; it is his best-selling studio album.

In the US it was certified gold on 12 October 1973 (just days after release), 5× platinum in March 1993, and eventually 8× platinum in February 2014 by the RIAA.

Legacy
The album was inducted into the Grammy Hall of Fame in 2003, and was included in the 2005 book 1001 Albums You Must Hear Before You Die.

In 2003 and 2012, the album was ranked number 91 on Rolling Stone magazine's list of the 500 greatest albums of all time, and re-ranked number 112 in a 2020 revised list.

Goodbye Yellow Brick Road ranked number 59 in Channel 4's 2009 list of 100 Greatest Albums.

According to Acclaimed Music, it is the 150th most celebrated album in popular music history.

Track listing

Personnel 
According to the album's liner notes.  Track numbers refer to CD and digital releases of the album.
 Elton John – vocals, acoustic piano (1–6, 8–10, 12–17), Fender Rhodes (5, 6), Farfisa organ (3, 5, 7, 13), mellotron (5, 6, 11)
 David Hentschel – ARP synthesizer (1, 12)
 Davey Johnstone – acoustic guitar, electric guitar, Leslie guitar, slide guitar, steel guitar, banjo, backing vocals (1, 2, 4, 10, 13, 17)
 Dee Murray – bass guitar, backing vocals (1, 2, 4, 10, 13, 17)
 Nigel Olsson – drums, congas, tambourine, backing vocals (1, 2, 4, 10, 13, 17), car effects (12)
 Ray Cooper – tambourine (12)
 Del Newman – orchestral arrangements (4, 8–10, 15, 17)
 David Katz – orchestra contractor (4, 8–10, 15, 17)
 Leroy Gómez – saxophone solo (16)
 Kiki Dee – backing vocals (12)
 Uncredited – Vocal interjections on "Jamaica Jerk-Off" (credited to Prince Rhino, Reggae Dwight and Toots Taupin, possibly a pseudonym for Elton John and Bernie Taupin, though this is uncertain), drum machine, maracas, timbales, claves on "Jamaica Jerk-Off", castanets on "Funeral for a Friend", shaker on "I've Seen That Movie Too", tambourine on "Social Disease", accordion, vibraphone on "Sweet Painted Lady"

Production
 Gus Dudgeon – producer, liner notes
 David Hentschel – engineer
 Peter Kelsey – assistant engineer
 Andy Scott – assistant engineer
 Barry Sage – tape operator (not listed in album credits)
 David Larkham – art direction, artwork
 Michael Ross – art direction, artwork
 Ian Beck – artwork
 John Tobler – liner notes

Charts

Weekly charts

Year-end charts

Certifications and sales

References

External links

Elton John albums
1973 albums
Grammy Hall of Fame Award recipients
Albums produced by Gus Dudgeon
Albums recorded at Trident Studios
DJM Records albums
MCA Records albums
Albums recorded in a home studio